Estevão Martins de Leomil (13th-century) was a Portuguese nobleman, Lord of Couto de Leomil (pt).

Estevão was the son of Martim Vicente, and grandson of Vicente Viegas, lord of Couto de Leomil and his wife Sancha. He was married to Urraca Rodrigues daughter of Rui Mendes da Fonseca and Teresa Anes de Leomil.
Estevão Martins de Leomil is a direct descendant of Garcia Moniz, o Gasco.

References 

13th-century Portuguese people
14th-century Portuguese people
Portuguese nobility